Williams & Connolly LLP is an American law firm based in Washington, D.C. The firm was founded by trial lawyer Edward Bennett Williams in collaboration with Paul Connolly, a former student of his. Williams left the partnership of D.C. firm Hogan & Hartson to launch his own litigation firm. 

High-profile cases include the successful defense of U.S. President Clinton's impeachment, representation of Enron's law firm Vinson & Elkins, representation of the motion picture studios in the Kazaa/Grokster file-trading litigation, defense of the Vioxx cases, and counsel for the plaintiff states in the United States v. Microsoft antitrust remedy trial. The firm represented Lieutenant Colonel Oliver North during the Iran-Contra Affair and John Hinckley, the would-be assassin of Ronald Reagan.

Clientele 
Williams & Connolly partner Robert Barnett has represented Barack Obama, Bill Clinton, George W. Bush, James Patterson, Hillary Rodham Clinton, Michelle Obama, Laura Bush, Bob Woodward, Sarah Palin, Dick Cheney, Alan Greenspan, Katharine Graham, Ben Bernanke, Paul Ryan, Tim Russert, Barbra Streisand, Jack Welch, Khaled Hosseini, Bill Walton, Mitch McConnell, Jake Tapper, and others. The firm also represented Elizabeth Holmes in her Theranos criminal trial.

The firm's corporate clients include Google, Disney, Samsung, Intel, Bank of America, The Carlyle Group, Medtronic, Genentech, Eli Lilly, and 21st Century Fox.

Recognition
In 2021, Vault.com ranked Williams & Connolly as the #1 firm for White Collar Defense and Internal Investigation in the United States, and the #2 law firm in Washington, DC. Williams & Connolly was ranked in 2021 as the most selective law firm in the country. Williams & Connolly is the subject of Masters of the Game: Inside the World's Most Powerful Law Firm by Kim Eisler.

Alumni 
Prominent alumni of the firm include: 
 Elena Kagan, Associate Justice of the United States Supreme Court 
 Brett Kavanaugh, Associate Justice of the United States Supreme Court
 Jeffrey Kindler, former CEO of Pfizer
 Larry Lucchino, President and CEO Emeritus of the Boston Red Sox
 Gregory Craig, former White House Counsel under President Barack Obama
 Mike Pompeo, Secretary of State
 Amul Thapar, Judge on the United States Sixth Circuit Court of Appeals
 Allison Jones Rushing, Judge on the United States Court of Appeals for the Fourth Circuit
 Scott Matheson, Judge on the United States Court of Appeals for the Tenth Circuit
Over the past decade, 45 SCOTUS clerks have been full-time or summer associates with Williams & Connolly. Associate Justices Elena Kagan and Brett Kavanaugh are both alumni of the firm.

References

External links

Robert B. Barnett profile mentioning the Clintons and other notable persons as clients
Washingtonpost.com Special Report: Clinton Accused: Defense Who's Who, with lawyers Gregory B. Craig, David E. Kendall and Nicole K. Seligman connected to Williams & Connolly profiled
The Defense: Clinton's Team, similar profile at CNN
 Article on the defense of Kentucky governor Paul E. Patton.

Law firms established in 1967
Law firms based in Washington, D.C.
1967 establishments in Washington, D.C.